Sparksville is an unincorporated community in Carr Township, Jackson County, Indiana.

History
Sparksville was platted in 1857. The community was named in honor of Stephen Sparks, who had operated a ferry near the town site. A post office was established at Sparksville in 1856, and remained in operation until it was discontinued in 1956. A ferry bridge was built east of Sparksville in 1890.

Geography

Climate
The climate in this area is characterized by hot, humid summers and generally mild to cool winters.  According to the Köppen Climate Classification system, Sparksville has a humid subtropical climate, abbreviated "Cfa" on climate maps.

References

Unincorporated communities in Jackson County, Indiana
Unincorporated communities in Indiana
1857 establishments in Indiana